Carignan (Bouthiller) Aerodrome  is an aerodrome located  north northeast of Carignan, Quebec, Canada.

References

Registered aerodromes in Montérégie